Down There Press is an independently run feminist book, DVD, and audiobook publisher that focuses on sexuality. It publishes both visual and literary erotica, and is known for its publications on youth and adolescent sexuality. 

Down There Press was founded by sex educator Joani Blank in 1975 in San Francisco, California. Blank's 1975 book The Playbook for Women About Sex was the first publication. Blank has published all of her work through the press.

Herotica, a collection of women's erotica, was the first fiction series that the press published.

Down There Press carries titles from authors such as Carol Queen, Jack Morin, Isadora Alman, Kate Dominic, Susie Bright, Cathy Winks, and Martha Cornog.

See also
Good Vibrations

Notes and references

Publishing companies based in the San Francisco Bay Area
Small press publishing companies
Sex education
Feminist book publishing companies
Companies based in San Francisco
1975 establishments in California
Publishing companies established in 1975